The platform economy is economic and social activity facilitated by platforms. Such platforms are typically online sales or technology frameworks. By far the most common type are "transaction platforms", also known as "digital matchmakers". Examples of transaction platforms include Amazon, Airbnb, Uber, and Baidu. A second type is the "innovation platform", which provides a common technology framework upon which others can build, such as the many independent developers who work on Microsoft's platform.

Forerunners to contemporary digital economic platforms can be found throughout history, especially in the second half of the 20th century. Yet it was only in the year 2000 that the "platform" metaphor started to be widely used to describe digital matchmakers and innovation platforms. Especially after the financial crises of 2008, companies operating with the new "platform business model" have swiftly come to control an increasing share of the world's overall economic activity, sometimes by disrupting traditional business. Examples include the decline of BlackBerry and Nokia due to competition from platform companies, the closing down of Blockbuster due to competition from the Netflix platform, or the many other brick and mortar retailers that have closed in part due to competition from Amazon and other online retailers. In 2013, platform expert Marshall Van Alstyne observed that three of the top five companies in the world used the platform business model. However, traditional businesses need not always be harmed by platforms; they can even benefit by creating their own or making use of existing third-party platforms. According to a 2016 survey by Accenture "81% of executives say platform-based business models will be core to their growth strategy within three years." In the year 2000 there were only a handful of large firms that could be described as platform companies. As of 2016, there were over 170 platform companies valued at US$1 billion or more. The creation and usage of digital platforms is also increasing in the government and NGO sectors.

The rise of platforms has been met by a mixed response from commentators. Many have been enthusiastic, arguing that platforms can improve productivity, reduce costs, reduce inefficiencies in existing markets, help create entirely new markets, provide flexibility and accessibility for workers, and be especially helpful for less developed countries. Arguments against platforms include that they may worsen technological unemployment, that they contribute to the replacement of traditional jobs with precarious forms of employment that have much less labour protection, that they can worsen declining tax revenues, and that excessive use of platforms can be psychologically damaging and corrosive to communities. Since the early 2010s, the platform economy has been the subject of many reviews by academic groups and NGOs, by national governments and by transnational organisations like the EU. Early reviews were generally against the imposition of heavy regulation for the platform economy. Since 2016, and especially in 2017, some jurisdictions began to take a more interventionist approach. Platform workers often work irregular and long hours, putting them at risk of cardiovascular diseases.

Platform definition
The 'platform' metaphor has long been used in a variety of ways. In the context of platform economy, 21st-century usage of the word platform sometimes refers solely to online matchmakers such as Uber, Airbnb, TaskRabbit etc. Academic work and some business books often use the term in a wider sense, to include non-digital matchmakers like a business park or a nightclub, and also to other entities whose function is not primarily to support transactions. Platform co-author Alex Moazed explains that “platforms don’t own the means of production, they create the means of connection.”  Platforms scholars Professor Carliss Y. Baldwin and Dr C. Jason Woodard have offered a generalised definition of economic platforms where the focus was on the technical side of the platform: "a set of stable components that support variety and evolvability in a system by constraining the linkages among the other components". Woodard and Baldwin have stated that at a high level of abstraction, the architecture of all platforms is the same: a system partitioned into a set of core components with low variety and a complementary set of peripheral components with high variety. Others define it based on the ecosystem perspective where the focus was on the actors around the platform ecosystem (e.g., buyers, sellers). For more discussion of definitions, see the paper Digital Platforms: A Review and Future Directions

Platformization
Platformization is the increasing domination of the internet by a number of large companies whose products work as markets between users and other sellers. Nieborg and Poell have defined the concept as "the penetration of economic and infrastructural extensions of online platforms into the web, affecting the production, distribution, and circulation of cultural content."

In the early 2000s, the term 'platform' was gaining prominence in business and academic discussions about the internet. Poell and Nieborg describe how "In the early 2000s, US companies such as Microsoft, Intel, and Cisco provided management scholars with rich examples of how to attain “platform leadership” (Gawer & Cusumano, 2002). One of the most influential contributions to this scholarship conceptualised platforms (e.g., game consoles) as “two-sided markets” (Rochet & Tirole, 2003)." However, critics including Poell, Nieborg and Gillespie have suggested that the use of the term 'platform' intentionally obscured the business models and technological structures of these companies. Gillespie noted that “Figuratively, a platform is flat, open, sturdy. In its connotations, a platform offers the opportunity to act, connect, or speak in ways that are powerful and effective... a platform lifts that person above everything else”.

Discussions of platforms as things began to shift towards platformization as a process in the 2010s. Helmond (2015) defined platformization as the “penetration of platform extensions into the web, and the process in which third parties make their data platform-ready”. This process includes the use of application programming interfaces (APIs), which connect the data of third parties to the platform, and Software Development Kits (SDKs), which allow third parties to integrate their software with the platform. Plantin, Lagoze and Edwards have contributed to the discussion on platformization by describing how platform companies have started to resemble digital infrastructure, like the “modern-day equivalents of the railroad, telephone, and electric utility monopolies of the late 19th and the 20th centuries”.

Business studies scholars have emphasized the 'network effects' that accrue to platform corporations, while other critics have described how the process of platform monopolisation concentrates capital and wealth in the hands of a small number of business owners, while the platforms themselves thrive off labour exploitation. Trebor Sholz has said that “wage theft is a feature, not a bug” of crowdsourced labour platforms like Amazon's Mechanical Turk. Poell and Nieborg argue that "in the tradition of cultural studies", the process of platformization should be conceived of as "the reorganisation of cultural practices and imaginations around platforms."

Simple definitions of the complex idea of platformisation also exist, such as, "Platformization is when you create a marketplace as your service, then charge people to use it." However, this definition only captures the process of platformization in terms of markets, while Poell and Nieborg argue that platformization "unfolds along three institutional dimensions: data infrastructures, markets, and governance".

Related concepts
Also known as the digital platform or online platform economy, the platform economy is economic (the buying, selling and sharing of goods and services ) and social activity facilitated by platforms. Such activity is wider than just commercial transactions, including for example online collaboration on projects such as Wikipedia. While scholarship on platforms sometimes includes discussion of non digital platforms, the term "platform economy" is often used in a sense that encompasses only online platforms.

"Platform economy" is one of a number of terms aiming to capture subsets of the overall economy which are now mediated by digital technology. The terms are used with diverse and sometimes overlapping meanings; some commentators use terms like "sharing economy" or "access economy" in such a broad sense they effectively mean the same thing. Other scholars and commentators do attempt to draw distinctions and use the various terms to delineate different parts of the wider digital economy. The term "platform economy" can be viewed as narrower in scope than "digital economy", but wider in scope than terms like "on demand economy", "sharing economy" or "gig economy". Several scholars have argued that "platform economy" is the preferable term for discussing several aspects of emergent digital phenomena in the early 21st century. 

The "platform economy" corresponds to the sum of "marketplaces", which form part of a larger entity analysed from a legal-philosophical perspective in a new glossary developed by an interdiscipinary team forming part of the Internet Governance Forum called the Dynamic Coalition of Platform Responsibility.

Digital economy 
The term digital economy generally refers to all or nearly all economic activity relying on computers. As such it can be seen as having the widest scope; encompassing the platform economy, and also digital activities not mediated by actual platforms. For example, economic transactions completed solely by email, or exchanges over EDIs, some of which operate between only two companies so are too closed off to be considered platforms. Some scholars draw a distinction between platforms and earlier websites, excluding even sites such as Craigslist that are used to support economic transactions. Such sites can be considered outside the platform economy, not because they are too closed off, but as they are too open to be classed as platforms.

On-demand economy 
The terms "On-demand" or access economy are sometimes used in a broad sense, to include all activity from transaction platforms, and much else. Some commentators, however, assign the access economy a narrower definition, so that it excludes platforms in the sharing economy. Even when sharing and on-demand platforms are distinguished in this way however, they are still both included in the wider "platform economy".

Sharing economy 
The term sharing economy is also used with a wide range of scopes. According to Rachel Botsman, one of the prominent analysts of the sharing economy, the ‘sharing economy’ as a term has been incorrectly applied to ideas where there is just a model of matching supply with demand, but zero sharing and collaboration involved. There is a fundamental difference between platforms such as Deliveroo, Dashdoor which operates on the basis of meeting instant demand with a constant pool of labour and platforms like BlaBlaCar or Airbnb, which are genuinely built on the sharing of underused assets. So, mere delivery may not qualify as a sharing economy, but it is a mobile-driven version of point-to-point delivery. However, due to the positive connotations of the word "sharing", several platforms that don't involve sharing in the traditional sense of the word have still liked to define themselves as part of the sharing economy. Yet academic and some popular commentators define the sharing economy as only including activity that involves peer to peer transactions; in these narrow definition most of the platform economy is outside of the sharing economy.

Gig economy 
The Gig economy refers to various forms of temporary work. The phrase is sometimes used with a broad scope, to include traditional offline temporary and contract work; in that sense, parts of the gig economy are outside the platform economy. In the narrow sense of the phrase, the gig economy refers solely to work mediated by online labour market platforms, for example PeoplePerHour. In this narrow sense, an important sub division is between local and remote gig work. Local gigs require the worker to be present in person as is the case for Uber or most TaskRabbit work. For remote work, also known as the "human cloud", tasks can be done anywhere in the world, as is generally the case with Mechanical Turk or the upwork platform. A 2017 study estimated that worldwide, about 70 million people have registered on the remote labour platforms. The global gig economy, in 2018, generated $204 billion in gross volume (with vehicle for hire services comprising 58% of this value), while this number is expected to grow to $455 billion in 2023. Moreover, surveys yield that 5–9 per cent of adult Internet users in various European countries are involved in working through such platforms weekly, while annual growth rate of the gig platform users is forecasted to be 26 per cent.

The word 'gig' in the term 'gig economy' is suggestive of short-term arrangements typical of a musical event. 
 'Gig' suggests an arrangement similar to musicians being booked for a gig at a particular venue. Such bookings typically have a specified time and won't be long term. As a result, there is no guarantee of repeat bookings, and sometimes no defined method of payment. Parallels exist between etymological meaning of the term related to the musicians’ tasks and the gig economy. For example, gig jobs are classified as contingent work arrangements (in the US-context) rather than full-time or even hourly wage positions. Tasks in the gig economy have been characterized as short, temporary, precarious, and unpredictable. They can also increase accessibility, geographic, and social inclusion in the labour markets, and provide workers with a sense of autonomy.

History

Pre Internet era
Businesses operating on some of the principles underpinning contemporary digital platforms have been in operation for millennia. For example, matchmakers who helped men and women find suitable marriage partners operated in China since at least 1100 BC. Grain exchanges from ancient Greece have been compared to contemporary transactional platforms, as have medieval fairs.
 
Examples of innovation platforms also predate the internet era. Such as geographic regions famous for particular types of production, institutions like Harvard Business School, or the Wintel technology platform that became prominent in the 1980s.

Post Internet
The viability of large scale transaction platforms was vastly increased due to improvements in communication and connectedness brought about by the Internet. Online market platforms such as Craigslist and eBay were launched in the 1990s. Forerunners to modern social media and online collaboration platforms were also launched in the 1990s,  with more successful platforms such as Myspace and Wikipedia emerging in the early 2000s. After the financial crisis of 2007–08, new types of online platforms have risen to prominence, including asset-sharing platforms such as Airbnb, and labour market platforms such as TaskRabbit.

Etymology and early research
According to the OED, the word "platform" has been used since the 16th century, both in the concrete sense to refer to a raised surface, and as a metaphor. However, it was only in the 1990s that the concept of economic platforms began to receive significant attention from academics. In the early 90s, such work tended to focus on innovation or product platforms, defined in a broad sense that did not focus on online activity. Even as late as 1998, there was little focus on transaction platforms, and according to professors David S. Evans and Richard L. Schmalensee, the platform business model as it would be understood in the 21st century was not then recognised by scholars.

The first academic paper to address the platform business model and its application to digital matchmakers is said to be Platform Competition in Two-Sided Markets by Jean-Charles Rochet and Jean Tirole.  An early management research book on platforms was Platform Leadership: How Intel, Microsoft and Cisco Drive Industry Innovation, by Annabelle Gawer and Michael Cusumano (published in 2002). One of the academics most responsible for connecting those working in the emerging field of platform scholarship was professor Annabelle Gawer; in 2008 she held the first international conference on platforms at London.

The platform business model
The platform business model involves profiting from a platform that allows two or more groups of users to interact. The model predates the internet; for example, a newspapers with a classified ads section effectively uses the platform business model. The emergence of digital technology has "turbocharged" the model, although it is by no means a sure path to success. While the most successful "born-social" firms can in just a few years achieve multibillion-dollar valuations, along with brand loyalty comparable to the largest traditional companies, most platform business start ups fail. 

Some companies are dedicated to the platform business model; for example, many so-called born-social startups. Other companies can operate their own platform(s) yet still run much of their business on more traditional models. A third set of firms may not run their own platform, but still have a platform strategy for utilising third-party platforms. According to a 2016 survey by Accenture, "81% of executives say platform-based business models will be core to their growth strategy within three years." 
 According to research published by McKinsey in 2019,  84% of traditional firms either owned their own platform or utilised one operated by a third party,  while for born digital firms, only 5% lacked a platform strategy. Mckinsey found that firms with a platform presence - either their own or via a third party - enjoyed on average an almost 1.4% higher annual EBIT growth.

Some of the principles governing the operations of matchmaking platforms differ sharply when compared with traditional business models. The selling of products or services is central to most traditional businesses, whereas for transaction platforms, connecting different groups of users is the key focus. For example, a traditional mini cab company sells taxi services, whereas a platform company might connect drivers with passengers. 
Another distinguishing feature of the platform business model is that it emphasises network effects, and the inter-dependence of demand between the different groups that use the platform. So with a platform business, it often makes sense to provide services free to one side of the platform, e.g. to the users of a social media service like Facebook. The cost of this subsidy is more than offset by the extra demand a large user base generates for the revenue generating side(s) of the platform (e.g. advertisers).

According to authors Alex Moazed and Nicholas L. Johnson, BlackBerry Limited (formerly RIM) and Nokia lost massive market share to Apple and Google's Android in the early 2010s, as RIM and Nokia were acting as product companies in a world now best suited to platforms. As former Nokia CEO Stephen Elop wrote in 2011 "We’re not even fighting with the right weapons, ... The battle of devices has now become a war of ecosystems."

Creating a digital platform
Many books covering the platform economy devote chapters to the challenges involved in creating platforms: both for new platform startups, and for traditional organisations wishing to adopt a platform strategy. Some books are even dedicated just to certain aspects of operating a platform, such as nurturing ecosystems. The work involved in creating a platform can be broadly divided into elements relating to technical functionality and network effects; for many but not all platforms, a great deal of effort also needs to go into the cultivation of ecosystems.

Technical functionality
Developing the core technical functionality can sometimes be unexpectedly cheap. Courtney Boyd Myers wrote in 2013 that a platform with the core functionality of Twitter could be developed almost for free. A person who already had a laptop could take a $160 Ruby on Rails course, spend about 10 hours writing the code, and then host the Twitter clone on a free Web hosting service. A service that would have a chance of attracting a good user base, however, would need to be developed to at least the level of being a Minimum viable product (MVP). An MVP requires development well beyond a core set of technical functionality, for example, it needs to have a well-polished user experience layer. Boyd Meyers reported estimates that to develop an MVP for a platform like Twitter, the cost could range from $50,000 to $250,000, whereas for a platform needing more complex functionality such as Uber, the cost could range from $1 to $1.5 million. This was in 2013, considerably more has since been spent on technical development for the Uber platform. For other platforms, however, developing the needed technical functionality can be relatively easy. The more difficult task is to attract a large enough user base to ensure long term growth, in other words to create sufficient network effects.

Network effects

Platforms tend to be a strong beneficiary of network effects; phenomena that can act to increase the value of a platform to all participants as more people join. Sometimes it makes sense for a platform to treat different sides of their network differently. For example, a trading platform relies on both buyers and sellers, and if there is say a shortage of buyers compared to the number of sellers, it might make sense for the platform operator to subsidize buyers, at least temporarily. Perhaps with free access or even with rewards for choosing to use the platform. Sometimes the benefits of network effects can be overestimated, such as with the so-called "grab all the eyeballs fallacy", where a large audience is attracted to a platform, but there proves to be no profitable way to monetise it.

Ecosystems
In the context of digital platforms, ecosystems are collections of economic actors not controlled by the platform owner, yet who add value in ways that go beyond being a regular user. A common example is the community of independent developers who create applications for a platform, such as the many developers (both individuals and companies) that create apps for Facebook. With Microsoft, significant components of their ecosystem include not just developers, but computer and hardware peripheral manufactures, as well as maintenance and training providers. 
A traditional company embarking on a platform strategy has a head start in creating an ecosystem if they already have a list of partners, alliances and/or resellers. A startup company looking to grow an ecosystem might expose elements of its platform via publicly available APIs. Another approach is to have an easily accessible partnership sign up facility, with the offer of free or subsidised benefits for partners.

Platform owners usually attempt to promote and support all significant actors in their ecosystems, though sometimes there is a competitive relationship between the owner and some of the companies in their ecosystem, very occasionally even a hostile one.

Typology
Scholars have acknowledged platforms are challenging to categorise, due to their variety. A relatively common approach is to divide platforms into four types, based on the principle ways they add utility, rather than being concerned with which particular sectors they serve. These four types are transaction, innovation, integrated, and investment. Other ways to categorize digital platforms are discussed in Digital Platforms: A Review and Future Directions

Transaction platforms
Also known as two-sided markets, multisided markets, or digital match making firms, transaction platforms are by far the most common type of platform. These platforms often facilitate various forms of online buying and selling, though sometimes most or all transactions supported by the platform will be free of charge.
Transactions platforms  are also seen as retail platforms. these platforms are among the most widely recognized and have popularized the concept of platform economy. Platforms like Amazon, Ebay are often seen as retail platforms. Many other hosts can also fall under this definition.

Innovation platforms

Innovation platforms provide a technological foundation, often including a set of common standards, upon which an ecosystem of third parties can develop complementary products and services to resell to consumers and other businesses. Examples of platform companies include Microsoft and Intel. Innovation platforms often stimulate ecosystem innovation.

Integrated platforms
Integrated platforms combine features of both transaction and innovation platforms. Apple, Google, and Alibaba have been classified as integrated platforms. Several integrated platform companies operating multiple discreet platforms and could also be described as "platform conglomerates", while some others are more integrated and derive synergies from combining innovation and transaction platforms.

Investment platforms
Investment platforms are companies that might not themselves operate a major platform, but which act as holding vehicles for other platform companies, or which invest in multiple platform businesses.

Global distribution, international development, and geostrategy
Platforms are sometimes studied through the lens of their differing distributions and impact across the world's geographic regions. Some early work speculated that the rise of the platform economy could be a new means by which the United States could maintain its hegemony. While the largest platform companies by market capitalisation remain US-based, platforms based in India and Asia are fast catching up, and several authors writing in 2016 and later took the opposite view, speculating that the platform economy will help accelerate a shift of economic power towards Asia.

Africa

Numerous successful platforms have been launched in Africa, several of which have been home grown. In the early 2010s, there were reports by journalists, academics and development workers that Africa has been leading the world in some platform related technologies, such as by "leapfrogging" traditional fixed line internet applications and going straight to developing mobile apps. In the field of mobile money for example, it was the success of Kenya's M-Pesa that brought the technology to global attention. 

Similar systems have been introduced elsewhere in Africa, for example, m-Sente in Uganda. M-Pesa itself has expanded out of Africa to both Asia and Eastern Europe. The system allows people who only have cheap SMS capable mobile phones to send and receive money. This and similar platform services have been enthusiastically welcomed both by the end-users, and by development workers who have noted their life-enhancing effects. Ushahidi is another set of technologies developed in Africa and widely used on platforms to deliver various social benefits. While many platforms in Africa are accessible just by SMS, uptake of smartphones is also high, with the FT reporting in 2015 that mobile internet adoption is happening at double the global rate. Compared to other regions, there may have been less negative effects caused by platforms in Africa, as there has been less legacy economic infrastructure to disrupt, which also has provided an opportunity to build new systems from "ground zero". Though some legacy businesses have still been disrupted by the rise of platforms in Africa, with sometimes only the more productive firms being able to overcome barriers to adopting digital technologies.

By 2017, some of the excitement concerning home grown platform technology and the wider Africa Rising narrative has cooled, in line with recent falls in commodity prices reducing the short-term economic prospects for much of the continent. Yet optimism remains that the continent is heading in the right direction. A global survey identified 176 platform companies with a valuation over one billion dollars, yet only one was based in Africa. This was Naspers, which is headquartered in Cape Town, a city that also hosts many other smaller platform companies. A survey focused on smaller platforms based in Africa found few are either wholly foreign or indigenously owned, with most being a mixture. 

In 2019, Africa's digital platforms recorded a robust growth in form of 365 unique platforms, making up a 37% increase year on year. These represent freelance, shopping and e-hailing platforms. However, as the platform economy in the continent continue to grow, and new platforms enter the market, there is a high level of churn (high numbers of such platforms entering the market, and incumbent ones exiting). Hence, there is the existence of extreme competition for the incumbent platforms. About 64% of the overall platforms mediate activities that are place-based, thereby directly contributing to absorbing the capacity of local labor capacity. These place-based platforms are said to have been useful in the delivery of essential goods to consumers in the light of COVID-19 lockdown measures in key African geographies (Ghana, Kenya, Nigeria, Rwanda, South Africa, Tanzania, Uganda and Zambia).

Asia
The 2016 global survey found that Asia was home to the largest number of platform companies having a market capitalisation over $930bn. Asia had 82 such companies, though their combined market value was only $930bn, second to North America with market capitalization of $3,000bn. Much of Asia's platform companies are concentrated in hubs located in Bangalore and Hangzhou. More specifically, according to the 2016 regional survey, China significantly accounted for 73% of market cap while Northeast Asia, India, and ASEAN had 22%, 4%, and 1% respectively. Within China, homegrown platforms tend to dominate across the whole platform economy, with most of the big American platforms being banned. eBay is allowed to trade in China, but has a relatively small market share compared to Chinese eCommerce platforms and was eventually shut down in 2006. In 2018, Tmall (Alibaba) took the majority proportion of e-commerce market share in China at 61.5%, followed by JD at 24.2%. Outside of China, Asian-based platforms have been enjoying rapid growth in areas relating to eCommerce, yet until the rise of  TikTok, less so in social media and search. Facebook, for example, is the most popular social media platform even in India, a country with several large homegrown platforms, while in Myanmar, the New York Times described Facebook as "so dominant that to many people it is the internet itself." In 2016, Northeast Asia that consists of Japan and Korea had 17 platform companies with collective market capitalization of $244bn; the top five platform companies and their origin were Softbank (Tokyo, Japan), Yahoo Japan (Tokyo, Japan), Nintendo (Tokyo, Japan), Naver (Seongnam, South Korea), and Rakuten (Tokyo, Japan). India had less platform companies than Northeast Asia. There were 9 major platform companies with collective market capitalization of $39bn and the biggest platforms were two e-commerce companies Flipkart and Snapdeal. The smallest number of market share went to Southeast Asia that was home to three platform companies Garena (Singapore), Grab (Malaysia), and GO-JEK (Indonesia) that collectively had market capitalization of $7bn.

Europe
Europe is home to a large number of platform companies, but most are quite small. In terms of platform companies that were valued over $1bn, Europe was found to have only 27 in the 2016 global survey. So far ahead of Africa and South America, but lagging well behind Asia and North America.

However, as of 2020 the German and French governments with backing from the European Commission are now pushing the idea of GAIA-X, an integrated super-platform that would give the EU digital autonomy from the influence of large American and Chinese platform providers, sometimes described as an "Airbus for Cloud".

North America

North America, in particular the United States, is home to the world's top 5 global platform companies Google, Amazon, Apple, Facebook, and IBM. A 2016 global survey of all platform companies with a market cap over $1bn, found 44 such companies headquartered in the San Francisco Bay Area alone, with those companies having a total value of $2.2 trillion 52% of the total worldwide value of such platform companies. Overall, the United States had 63 platform companies valued over $1bn, with Canada having one. While North America has less large platform companies than Asia, it is the clear leader in terms of overall market capitalisation, and in having platform companies with a global reach.

South America
According to data from early 2016, only three home grown platform companies with a market capitalisation greater than $1bn had emerged in South America: these are MercadoLibre, Despegar.com, and B2W. 
The continent is however home to many start up companies. In Brazil, the Portuguese language gives an advantage to home grown companies, with an especially active start up scene existing in São Paolo. Argentina has been the most successful in creating platforms used outside its own borders, with the countries relatively small home market encouraging a more global outlook from its start up platform companies.

With a high proportion of workers already employed on an informal basis, the platform-based gig economy has not grown as fast in South America as elsewhere. Though from a progressive perspective, scholars such as Adam Fishwick have noted that Latin America's tradition of worker organised activism may have valuable lessons for workers elsewhere seeking ways to mitigate the sometimes adverse effects of platforms on their economic security.

Platforms by ownership
Who the platform owns, depends on the type of the platform since there is a variety of platforms. Each platform has its own perspective that creates added value. Wikipedia, for instance, is an open source platform. This means that anyone can edit and contribute to its articles. Uber is a ride-hailing platform that connects passengers with drivers who provide transportation services. The platform is owned by a small group of entrepreneurs. Value is created through access to in real time services. The application boosted the sharing economy.
In the following, the four most present platforms are discussed.

Private sector
Most of the widely used platforms are owned by the private sector. In the 2016 GCE survey of platform companies valued over $1 billion, a total of 107 privately owned companies were found, versus 69 public companies (public in the sense of being private sector, but publicly traded ). While more numerous, the privately owned companies tended to be smaller, having a total market value of $300 billion, compared to $3,900 billion for the publicly traded companies.

Public sector
Some digital platforms are run by multilateral institutions, by national governments, and by local municipal bodies.

NGO
Over 90% of NGOs maintain a presence on the large privately owned social media platforms such as Facebook, with some also operating their own platforms.

Platform cooperatism

Platform cooperatism involves mutually owned platforms, being run "bottom up" by the people involved. Sometimes these platforms can effectively be competing for business with the privately owned platforms. In other cases, platform cooperatism seeks to help ordinary people have their say about political questions of the day, possibly supporting interaction with local government.

Assessment

With the increasing centrality of digital platforms to the global economy following the 2008 financial crisis, there was an intensification of interest in assessing their impact on society and the wider economy. Many hundreds of reviews have been carried out: some by individual scholars, others by groups of academics, some by think tanks bringing together folk from a range of backgrounds, and yet others overseen by governments and transnational organisations such as the EU. Many of these reviews focussed on the overall platform economy, others on narrower areas such as the gig economy or the psychological impact of social media platforms on individuals and communities.

Much early assessment was highly positive, sometimes even taking a "utopian" view on the benefits of platforms. It's been argued and to some extent demonstrated that platforms can enhance the supply of services, improve productivity, reduce costs (e.g. by disintermediation), reduce inefficiencies in existing markets, help create entirely new markets, increase flexibility, and labour market accessibility for workers, and be especially helpful for less developed countries. Both the IMF and World Bank for example have suggested that it's the countries and industries that are quickest to adopt new platform technologies that achieve the fastest and most sustainable growth.

 

Various arguments have been made against platforms. They include that platforms may contribute to technological unemployment. That they accelerate the replacement of traditional jobs with precarious forms of employment that have much less labour protection. That they may contribute to declining tax revenues. That excessive use of platforms can be psychologically damaging and corrosive to communities. That they can increase inequality. That they can reproduce patterns of racism. That platforms have a net negative impact on the environment.

Post 2017 backlash
Until 2017, most mainstream assessments of the platform economy were largely positive about its benefits to wider society. There were some exceptions; a forthcoming techlash had been predicted by Adrian Wooldridge as far back as 2013.  Further hardening of attitudes towards platforms from some commentators and regulators had been detectable from at least early 2015. There had been a few highly critical views, e.g. from Evgeny Morozov, who in 2015 described most platforms as "parasitic: feeding off existing social and economic relations". Yet such negative assessments were rare, especially from prominent commentators who had the attention of policy makers. This began to change in 2017. Across the world, the larger privately owned platforms were subject to increasing questioning about their expanding role and responsibilities.

In the US, the Financial Times reported a marked change of attitudes towards online platforms across the American political spectrum, triggered by their "sheer size and power". Among U.S. Democrats, leaders of the large platform companies reportedly went from "heroes to pariahs" in just a few months.
There has also been growing hostility towards the large platform companies from some members of the American right. High-profile figures such as Steve Bannon and Richard Spencer have argued for the break up of the large tech companies, and more mainstream Republicans were reported to be running for the 2018 congressional elections on anti big-tech tickets. 

2017 also saw increased critical attention towards the larger platforms from both European and Chinese regulators. In the case of China where several of the larger US owned platforms were already banned, the focus was on their biggest home grown platforms, with commentators expressing concerns that they have become too powerful.

Much recent criticism focusses on major platforms being too big; too powerful; anti competitive; damaging to democracy, such as with the Russian meddling in the 2016 election; and bad for users mental health. In December 2017 Facebook itself admitted passive consumption of social media could be harmful to mental health, though said active engagement can be helpful. In February 2018, Unilever, one of the world's leading spenders on advertising, threatened to pull adverts from digital platforms if they "create division, foster hate or fail to protect children."

Additional concerns have been raised due to the increasing role of AI. Some scientists argue that AI is a black-box and often lacks explainability. AI can operate as a black-box in which principles of conduct and end decisions may not have been predicted or perceived by the AI's creators, let alone users. Therefore, core operations carried out by AI in platforms can be criticized as biased and exploitative. The following threads of platform exploitation can be discerned: exploitation arising from relationship between algorithms and platform workers, from behavioural psychology tactics adapted to algorithmic management, and from information asymmetries enabling “soft” control.

Despite criticism from media figures and politicians, as of early 2018 the large privately owned platforms tended to remain "wildly popular" among ordinary consumers. After leading US platform companies revealed high Q1 revenue growth in late April 2018, the Financial Times reported they are untouched by the backlash, in a "stunning demonstration of their platform power". The techlash continued to gather momentum however.
In January 2019 "techlash" was chosen as the digital word of the year by the American Dialect Society. Yet despite ongoing high-profile criticism and legal actions, including CEOs of platform giants being grilled by legislatures on both sides of the Atlantic, the Daily Telegraph suggested in December 2019 that the techlash had largely failed to halt the growing power of platforms. 
Further criticism of the big platform companies continued into 2020. In February Mark Zuckerberg himself repeated his view that the big platform companies need further regulation from the state.

By May 2020, as a result of the COVID-19 pandemic the techlash was reported to have been put on hold. In the early stages of the pandemic, several major platforms had made small, but useful and popular contributions to help society respond to the virus, such as Apple and Google forming a partnership to assist with contact tracing. Following the widespread introduction of lockdowns across the world, platforms were credited for helping to keep economies running and society connected, with polls showing the popularity of platform companies among the public had increased. Yet some commentators, for example Naomi Klein, remained concerned about the still growing power of platforms.
In October 2020, antitrust charges were filed against Google in the U.S, starting legal proceedings that may take years to play out, but which have been described as the most significant challenge yet for big tech. Shortly after, the Federal Trade Commission began suing Facebook. Late 2020 saw Russia pass a law that would allow large fines to be levied against platform companies for various reasons, including if they censured Russian citizens. Also in late 2020, the Chinese government announced an antitrust probe of Alibaba, with officials noting the importance of the platform economy to China's development, but also expressing concerns about the risk for excessive market concentration. 
In February 2021, the Financial Times wrote that it was once again "business as usual" for the Techlash.

Regulation
During their early years, digital platforms tended to enjoy light regulation, sometimes benefiting from measures intended to help fledgling internet companies. The "inherently border-crossing" nature of platforms has made it challenging to regulate them, even when a desire has been there. Yet another difficulty has been lack of consensus about what exactly constitutes the platform economy.
Critics have argued existing law was not designed to deal with platform based companies. They expressed concern about elements such as safety and hygiene standards, taxes, compliance, crime, protection of rights and interests, and fair competition.

With many large platforms concentrated in China or the U.S., two contrasting approaches to regulation emerged. In the U.S., platforms have largely been left to develop free of state regulation. In China, while large platform companies like Tencent or Baidu are privately owned and in theory have much more freedom than SOEs, they are still tightly controlled, and also protected by the state against foreign competition, at least in their home market.

As of 2017, there had been talk of a "third way" being developed in Europe, less Laissez-faire than the approach in the U.S., but less restrictive than the approach in China. Possibilities for Co-regulation, where public regulators and the platform companies themselves cooperative to design and enforce regulation, are also being explored.

 
In March 2018, the EU published guidelines concerning the removal of illegal media from social media platforms, suggesting that if platform companies do not improve their self-regulation, new rules will come into effect at EU level before the end of the year.
The OECD is looking at regulating platform work, while the European Commission has stated that with new forms of work must come modern and improved forms of protection, including for those working via online platforms. With this in mind, the European Commission is planning to launch a new initiative on improving the working conditions for platform workers. In parallel with this, the European Commission has proposed a reform initiative for an EU minimum wage. New and existing labour unions have begun to become increasingly involved in representing workers engaged in the labour market section of the platform economy. With remote platform work having created what is in effect a planetary labour market, an attempt to encourage suitable working conditions on a global scale is being undertaken by the Fairwork foundation. Fairwork are seeking to move towards mutually agreeable conditions with the co-operation of platform owners, workers, unions, and governments.

On 15 December 2020 European Commission published proposals for two regulations to regulate the platform economy: the digital services act (DSA) and the digital markets act (DMA). The aim of the digital services act is to rebalance responsibilities of users, platforms, and public authorities to European values and to foster innovation, growth and competitiveness, and facilitate the scaling up of smaller platforms, SMEs and start-ups. The digital markets act establishes a set of narrowly defined objective criteria for qualifying a large online platform as a so-called “gatekeeper”. Pursuant to the DMA proposal, gatekeeper is a company which:

 has a strong economic position, significant impact on the internal market and is active in multiple EU countries;
 has a strong intermediation position, meaning that it links a large user base to a large number of businesses;
 has (or is about to have) an entrenched and durable position in the market, meaning that it is stable over time.

With the increasing concern about the platform economy and the related financial activities in Mainland China, the National Development and Reform Commission of China and seven other official departments published a note on 18 January 2022, indicating major proposals for future policy and regulation towards the fast-growing platform economy.  First of all, The note proposes that future amendments of the Anti Monopoly Law of China and the improvement of the supporting laws of the Data Security Law of the People's Republic of China and the  Personal Information Protection Law of the People's Republic of China are required for prohibiting unfair competition on the Internet and clarifying the boundaries of platform responsibility. Moreover, the note puts an emphasis on the protection of customers’ information, which is regarded as a key corporate asset in the current competitive market. Second, certain guidance should be implemented for helping platform companies to strengthen negotiations with workers in new forms of employment. To ensure the openness and transparency of the system, employment directly related to the rights and interests of laborers shall be released to the public. Third, the proposal suggests strengthening the supervision of the financial sector, and strictly scrutinizing improper payment practices and any illegal operations are important to maintain the market order. Fourth, key industries and fields that are closely related to platform business require improved competition supervision and law enforcement in the entire chain. Last but not least, the note mentions that new policies will be imposed to guide platform companies to further leverage the platform’s market and data advantages. Moreover, a new working mechanism is required to protect the legitimate rights and interests of Chinese platform companies in regard to technological innovation, enhance core competitiveness, overseas intellectual property protection assistance, dispute mediation, etc.

See also
 Circular economy
 Customer to customer
 Digital ecosystem
 Gig worker
 List of gig economy companies
 Platform capitalism
 Platform evangelism
 Two-sided market
 Uberisation

Digital services act

Notes

Citations

References

Further reading
 

 

 
Atal, Maha Rafi (2021). "The Janus faces of Silicon Valley". Review of International Political Economy.

 

Economic systems
Business models
Information economy
Economy by field